Pikelet  may refer to:

 a regional name for a crumpet
 a pancake in Australia and New Zealand
 the stage name of Australian musician Evelyn Morris

See also
Pikelot, an island in the State of Yap, Federated States of Micronesia